Li Xinyi may refer to:

 Li Xinyi (singer) (born 1998), Chinese singer and songwriter
 Li Xinyi (tennis) (born 1962), Chinese tennis player